Deer Plain is an unincorporated community in Calhoun County, Illinois, United States. Deer Plain is located in southeastern Calhoun County near the confluence of the Illinois and Mississippi rivers. It was named Deer Plain because it was common to see deer grazing in the area.

References

Unincorporated communities in Calhoun County, Illinois
Unincorporated communities in Illinois